Safety in Numbers may refer to:

Safety in numbers, a group protection theory

Music

Safety in Numbers (Crack the Sky album) (1978)
 Safety in Numbers (David Van Tieghem album) (1987)
Safety in Numbers (Margaret Urlich album) (1989)
Brand New / Safety in Numbers, Brand New album (2002)
Safety in Numbers (Umphrey's McGee album) (2006)
"Safety in Numbers", a song by Sadus from Elements of Anger (1997)
Safety in Numbers (musical), a 1982 Australian musical by Phillip Scott and Luke Hardy

Film 
 Safety in Numbers (1930 film)
 Safety in Numbers (1938 film)

Television

 Episode 3 of the Fox television drama, Touch (2012 TV series)